Grindelia hintoniorum is a rare North American species of flowering plants in the family Asteraceae. It is native to northeastern Mexico, found only in the State of Nuevo León.

Each head has 19-34 ray flowers surrounding many disc flowers.

References

hintoniorum
Plants described in 1990
Flora of Nuevo León